Cornelius Erwin "Swede" Righter (March 7, 1897 – August 30, 1985) was an American college football and college basketball player and coach, and a rugby union player who competed in the 1920 Summer Olympics.

Righter attended Stanford University, where he played football and basketball. He was Stanford's first All-Pacific Coast Conference basketball player in 1920. At the 1920 Olympics, Righter played on the American rugby union team that defeated France for the gold medal.

After his playing days, Righter coached basketball and football at the University of the Pacific from 1921 to 1933. In 12 season as head football coach, he led the Pacific Tigers football program to a record of 54–34–4. Righter coached the football team at Burlingame High School in Burlingame, California from 1934 to 1946. He was succeeded by Ted Forbes in 1947.

Righter died on August 30, 1985, in Dayton, Ohio.

Head coaching record

College football

References

External links
 

1897 births
1985 deaths
American men's basketball players
American rugby union players
Pacific Tigers football coaches
Pacific Tigers men's basketball coaches
Stanford Cardinal football players
Stanford Cardinal men's basketball players
Medalists at the 1920 Summer Olympics
Olympic gold medalists for the United States in rugby
Rugby union players at the 1920 Summer Olympics
United States international rugby union players
High school football coaches in California